40: Forty Hits From Forty Years 1977-2017 is a two-disc compilation album by British-American rock band Foreigner, released on May 19, 2017. The album includes two new recordings: a rerecording of "I Don't Want to Live Without You", and the new song "Give My Life for Love".

The compilation consists of some of Foreigner's biggest hits and popular album tracks from 1977 through the 2016 EP "The Flame Still Burns".

Background
The album celebrates Foreigner's 40th anniversary of their first release with Atlantic Records. The album includes all Foreigner's' biggest hits from 1977 to 2017. It was released through Atlantic Records and contains 40 tracks. To promote the album Foreigner toured.

Reception
David Chiu from Popmatters said, "This year is the 40th anniversary of the release of Foreigner's self-titled debut, and marking that milestone is this latest two-CD greatest hits compilation, simply called 40, which collects 40 (get it?) of the band's hits (the title and artwork are a nod to the band's 1981 smash album 4). There have been similar Foreigner double-disc packages (Jukebox Heroes and No End in Sight), but 40 is the most current by including tracks from 2009's Can't Slow Down and the group's recent single 'The Flame Still Burns'."

Neil Jeffries from LouderSound said, "This new collection is a career-spanning two-CD set that features 40 remastered tracks from 40 years. And it's all packaged to look a little like Foreigner 4, their greatest success from those four decades. What could be neater? There’s a 23-song double-vinyl version but, really, why would you bother with that?"

Track listing

Disc one

Disc two

Charts

Weekly charts

Year-end charts

Personnel
 Lou Gramm – lead vocals, percussion
 Mick Jones – lead guitar, keyboards, backing vocals
 Ian McDonald – rhythm guitar, woodwind, backing vocals
 Ed Gagliardi – bass, backing vocals
 Dennis Elliott – drums, percussion
 Al Greenwood – keyboards, synthesizers
 Rick Wills – bass, backing vocals
 Johnny Edwards – lead vocals, rhythm guitar
 Scott Gilman – rhythm guitar, woodwind, backing vocals
 Bruce Turgon – bass, backing vocals
 Mark Schulman – drums, backing vocals
 Jeff Jacobs – keyboards, backing vocals
 Kelly Hansen – lead vocals, percussion
 Thom Gimbel – rhythm guitar, woodwind, backing vocals
 Jeff Pilson – bass, backing vocal
 Brian Tichy – drums
 Michael Bluestein – keyboards, backing vocals

Notes

References

Foreigner (band) albums
2017 compilation albums
Atlantic Records compilation albums
Rhino Records compilation albums